The 1946–47 Detroit Red Wings season was the Red Wings' 21st season. The season involved Gordie Howe making his National Hockey League debut, and it was the final season for Jack Adams as coach.

Offseason

Regular season

Final standings

Record vs. opponents

Schedule and results

Player statistics

Regular season
Scoring

Goaltending

Playoffs
Scoring

Goaltending

Note: GP = Games played; G = Goals; A = Assists; Pts = Points; +/- = Plus-minus PIM = Penalty minutes; PPG = Power-play goals; SHG = Short-handed goals; GWG = Game-winning goals;
      MIN = Minutes played; W = Wins; L = Losses; T = Ties; GA = Goals against; GAA = Goals-against average;  SO = Shutouts;

Awards and records
 Jack Stewart, Defence, NHL Second Team All-Star
 Bill Quackenbush, Defence, NHL Second Team All-Star

References
Red Wings on Hockey Database

Detroit
Detroit
Detroit Red Wings seasons
Detroit Red Wings